The Roman Catholic Church in Tanzania is composed of 7 ecclesiastical provinces and 27 suffragan dioceses.

List of dioceses

Episcopal Conference of Tanzania

Ecclesiastical Province of Arusha 
Archdiocese of Arusha
Diocese of Mbulu
Diocese of Moshi
Diocese of Same

Ecclesiastical Province of Dar-es-Salaam 
Archdiocese of Dar-es-Salaam
Diocese of Morogoro
Diocese of Tanga
Diocese of Zanzibar
Diocese of Ifakara
Diocese of Mahenge

Ecclesiastical Province of Dodoma 
Archdiocese of Dodoma
Diocese of Kondoa
Diocese of Singida

Ecclesiastical Province of Mbeya 
Archdiocese of Mbeya
Diocese of Iringa
Diocese of Sumbawanga

Ecclesiastical Province of Mwanza 
Archdiocese of Mwanza
Diocese of Bukoba
Diocese of Bunda
Diocese of Geita
Diocese of Kayanga
Diocese of Musoma
Diocese of Rulenge-Ngara
Diocese of Shinyanga

Ecclesiastical Province of Songea 
Archdiocese of Songea
Diocese of Lindi
Diocese of Mbinga
Diocese of Mtwara
Diocese of Njombe
Diocese of Tunduru-Masasi

Ecclesiastical Province of Tabora 
Archdiocese of Tabora
Diocese of Kahama
Diocese of Kigoma
Diocese of Mpanda

External links 
Catholic-Hierarchy entry.
GCatholic.org.

Tanzania
Catholic dioceses